Raymond Anthony Codling was an inspector with Greater Manchester Police who was murdered at Birch Services on the M62 motorway near Heywood, Greater Manchester, in 1989.

Timeline
In the early hours of 14 September 1989, Codling, aged 49, in company with Sergeant James Bowden, 45, arrived at Birch motorway services between junctions 18 and 19, westbound, on the M62, looking for a white van, the details for which had been circulated by radio. The officers saw a motorcyclist, whom they approached, and he provided them with his details, which later proved to be false. A short time later they saw the man again, acting suspiciously, and the two officers approached him.

Bowden noticed that the man had a large knife in his belt and was holding his right hand inside his jacket. Bowden attempted to seize the knife but the man pulled back and drew out a 9 mm pistol. The man fired almost immediately at Bowden, but he escaped injury as the bullet was fired across his body and was deflected by the thick leather cover of his notebook in a breast pocket. The man then shot Codling in the chest; as he lay on the ground injured, a second shot was fired at Codling, killing him. Bowden attempted to give chase but was hit by a gunshot in the leg and was forced to take cover; he later recovered from emergency surgery. The suspect escaped.

After a manhunt, the gunman, later identified as Anthony Hughes from Baguley, was traced to a garage in Kendray, South Yorkshire. When officers entered they found Hughes' body; he had killed himself with the same gun used in the attack on Codling and Bowden. No motive was ever established for the attack, except that Hughes had previously carried out a series of armed robberies, had served 15 years in prison for a string of violent offences, and had indicated his desire to kill a police officer following an earlier court appearance for a minor offence for which he was fined.

In 1991, a memorial to Codling was unveiled at the place of his death by Michael Winner, founder of the Police Memorial Trust, and the Home Secretary, Kenneth Baker. In February 2010, the Bishop of Manchester, the Right Reverend Nigel McCulloch, met Codling's widow at a special memorial service at the Birch services.

See also
List of British police officers killed in the line of duty

References

Year of birth uncertain
1989 deaths
British police officers killed in the line of duty
Deaths by firearm in England
Deaths by person in England
Male murder victims
Murder in Greater Manchester
1980s in Greater Manchester
1989 murders in the United Kingdom
1989 in England
September 1989 events in the United Kingdom
Murder–suicides in the United Kingdom